Kamineni Eswara Rao (26 August 1918 – 7 November 2007) was an Indian weightlifter. He competed at the 1952 Summer Olympics and the 1956 Summer Olympics.

References

1918 births
2007 deaths
Indian male weightlifters
Olympic weightlifters of India
Weightlifters at the 1952 Summer Olympics
Weightlifters at the 1956 Summer Olympics
People from Krishna district
Asian Games medalists in weightlifting
Weightlifters at the 1951 Asian Games
Medalists at the 1951 Asian Games
Asian Games silver medalists for India
Recipients of the Arjuna Award
20th-century Indian people